Sidney William Brooks (February 22, 1893 – February 1, 1949) was an American Negro league outfielder between 1919 and 1926.

A native of Galveston, Texas, Brooks made his Negro leagues debut in 1919 with the St. Louis Giants. He played five seasons for the Giants, later known as the Stars. Brooks finished his career in 1926 with the Dayton Marcos. He died in St. Louis, Missouri in 1949 at age 55.

References

External links
 and Baseball-Reference Black Baseball stats and Seamheads

1893 births
1949 deaths
Dayton Marcos players
St. Louis Giants players
St. Louis Stars (baseball) players
St. Louis Giants (1924) players
Baseball outfielders
20th-century African-American sportspeople